Gay Mean Girls is a Canadian teen dramedy anthology web series created and directed by Heyishi Zhang, produced by Maddy Falle and co-producer Hayley Wong. The series first premiered in June 2019 at TIFF Next Wave to a sold-out audience, and then subsequently aired on a YouTube Channel of the same name, Shaftebury's KindaTV, and Revry. Gay Mean Girls examines issues within the LGBTQ+ community through coming of age stories about queer racialized teens. It is based on a viral short film that amassed over 3.5 million hits on YouTube.

Plot

Season 1 
The series follows the events of the short film while expanding on characters, themes, and other events. Prom committee member Lucy Ching seeks to establish Gay Prom Royalty to impress her best friend Miranda, feminist, lesbian beauty guru on YouTube. In the midst of questioning her sexuality, Lucy struggles to fit in with the white gay community. As she gains confidence in her leadership, she realizes that she cannot relate to Miranda's brand of white feminism, and forms allies with other characters who share her struggles.

Season 2 
The second season expands on the themes of season one while following a different group of students (with some recurring characters) and takes place the following school year. When student journalist Savannah Lin becomes embroiled in the complicated dynamics of a social justice "safe space", she must choose between protecting her community or the integrity of her voice in the wake of a betrayal. The season addresses themes of corruption within social justice spaces and the fight for narrative control.

Cast

Main (Season 1) 

 Vicky Li as Lucy Ching, an unpopular member of the prom committee hoping to better understand herself and her sexuality. 
 Hannah Raine as Miranda Hayes, an outgoing lesbian YouTuber and Lucy's best friend.
 Jordan Li as Jamie, the school's cool, non-binary drug dealer and friend of Lucy.
 Lane Webber as Anita, the enthusiastic president of the school's Gay Straight Alliance.
 Jensen Porter as Clara, an uptight straight-girl and president of the prom committee.

Main (Season 2) 

 Jenna Phoa as Savannah Lin
 Robyn Matuto as Jenn
 Vicky To as Skye
 Lydia Lowe as Amy
 Kat Khan as Katie

Episodes

Production

Season One 

The first season of Gay Mean Girls was funded by the Bell Fund and Telefilm's Talent to Watch Program. Principal photography began October 2018. The season premiered at TIFF NextWave in 2019 to a sold-out audience. On Global News, creator Heyishi Zhang says she drew inspiration for season one from her own high school relationships as well as her political awakening in university.

During the time of filming, Vicky Li was only fifteen years old. The rest of the cast was also relatively young, with Lane Webber and Jordan Li both being eighteen and members of the GSA at the high school where the series was shot.

As a series that explores feminism, intersectionality and the experience of racialized teens, all key creatives are the show are women, with the writer's room being composed entirely of queer women of colour. The team also spoke with a non-binary consultant when writing Jamie's character.

Season Two 

Season two of Gay Mean Girls was funded by the Bell Fund, Ontario Creates, the Canadian Media Fund  and Shaw Rocket Fund.

Principal photography for season two began March 2022. Season two has yet to be released.

Reception 
Gay Mean Girls has been praised for its candid exploration of intersectionality and the problematization of "white queerness" within the queer community. Critics have noted the show's subversion of stereotypes typical of queer romance, such as being in love with a best friend, having a white protagonist, and focusing solely on romantic love. Speaking on its modern, unapologetic nature, the online magazine starrymag points out, "[y]ou don't see a lot of shows bringing up topics like gaslighting and heteronormativity from the first episode and I was pleasantly surprised to see it discussed in such a raw and natural way, that’s still entertaining." Bella Media Channel compares Gay Mean Girls to other niche, queer series such as Carmilla and Barbelle.

In 2019, Gay Mean Girls was featured on Elle Canada's Pop Culture Radar.

References

External links

2019 web series debuts
Canadian comedy-drama web series
Canadian LGBT-related web series
Lesbian-related television shows
Transgender-related television shows